Obzor is a small town and seaside resort on the Black Sea coast of Bulgaria. It is part of Nesebar Municipality, Burgas Province. On February 28, 2021, the citizens of Obzor and six nearby villages voted in a referendum to separate from Nesebar Municipality and form an independent municipality, centred on Obzor. Voting activity was 76.02% and approximately 70% of people voted for independence.

It was a small port on the coast of Thrace, a colony of Mesembria. The ancient Romans named it Templum Iovis (Temple of Jupiter); Pliny called it Tetranaulochus. During the Ottoman rule of Bulgaria, it was known as Gözeken. The modern name was introduced in 1936; Obzor obtained town privileges on 9 September 1984.

The 2200-m-long Kaleto eco path connects the northwestern outskirts of Obzor with the remains of a medieval fortress. Visitors can see a 10-m-high waterfall and a mineral spring along the trail.

Trivia
Obzor Hill on Graham Land in Antarctica is named after the town.

Twin towns 
Obzor is twinned with:
  Dębica in Poland
  Svietlahorsk in Belarus

References

Seaside resorts in Bulgaria
Populated places in Burgas Province
Towns in Bulgaria
Populated coastal places in Bulgaria